= Marcelo Demarco =

Uruguayan disc jockey and record producer (born 1971)

Marcelo Demarco (born February 19, 1971), also known as Mark Demark, is an Uruguayan disc jockey and record producer. He began his professional career in the early 1990s in Montevideo's incipient rave scene. His style evolved from progressive house at his early stages to a very distinctive underground techno. In 2005, he created SexiBeats records where he released most of his productions but the Label never actually generate enough revenue and was eventually left behind. In 2011, he found Suro Records this time with better luck, the catalogue include artists like Alex Arnout, El Mundo & Satori, Cosmic Boys and Brisboys and had reached the top techno chart several times and have released his music on Suro Records, Dechapter, Cerebro, 0db recordings, Gorilla Recordings and Vitamina Records. He is the oldest techno dj still active in Uruguay.

== Discography ==
- Tostadita EP SexiBeats Records 2010-08-04
- Laton SexiBeats Records 2010-09-25
- Pequeña Habanera SexiBeats Records 2010-12-02
- Dr Voodoo SexiBeats Records 2011-05-07
- Automatik SexiBeats Records 2011-10-22
- 7 days of tequila Suro Records 2012-04-25
- Burning up SexiBeats Records 2012-10-15
- Runaway Suro Records 2012-10-24
- Rattlesnake Suro Records 2013-02-20
- Mischievously Suro Records 2013-06-01
- Where's Gorilla? 4 Gorilla Recordings 2014-10-20
- Be Quiet Suro Records 2014-10-27
- While I Weep Suro Records 2015-01-05
- A True Story Suro Records 2015-03-05
- Syncopated Soul Suro Records 2016-09-19
- Taste My Wasabi Suro Records 2016-11-07
- Mandinga Suro Records 2017-05-01
- Neon Bird Suro Records 2017-07-03
- Obey Suro Records 2017-10-23
- Bad Behaviour Suro Records 2018-09-21
- Makshlip You Dechapter 2018-11-16
- Brainstorm 1 Cerebro 2018-11-20
- Primary Suro Records 2019-01-25
- Don't Look Behind Suro Records 2019-06-14
- Critical Mass Suro Records 2019-07-26
- Dissident Suro Records 2019-08-16
- Techno For The Masses 2019-08-30
- Panic Attack Suro Records 2019-09-27
- The Singularity Suro Records 2020-03-06
